







































Lists of country codes